Nilamber Dev Sharma (October 6, 1931 – June 23 2020) was an Indian scholar and writer of Dogri and English literature, best known for his work, An Introduction to Modern Dogri Literature, the first publication in English about Dogri literature. The Government of India honored Sharma in 2011, with the fourth highest civilian award of Padma Shri.

Biography
Nilamber Dev Sharma was born to a Sanskrit scholar and a renowned astrologer, Madan Mohan Shastri, on 6 October 1931 at Jammu, British India. He graduated in English literature from the Government Gandhi Memorial College, Jammu (GGMC), continued his studies at the Hindu College, New Delhi from where he obtained a master's degree and started his career as an English lecturer in Kairana, Uttar Pradesh. He also secured an honours degree from the University of Leeds, UK. After a short stay at Kairana, Sharma moved to his alma mater, the Government Gandhi Memorial College, in 1953. Two years later, he joined Jammu and Kashmir Academy of Art, Culture and Languages in 1961 as its deputy secretary and rose to the position of the secretary. Nilamber Dev Sharma was the first convenor of the Dogri Advisory Board when Sahitya Academy officially recognized Dogri in 1969. In 1972, Sharma resigned from the Academy and entered politics, a stay which was short lived.

Sharma is a former director of the Amar Mahal Museum and Library and a former president of Dogri Sanstha. He is credited with several publications including An Introduction to Modern Dogri Literature, A Brief Survey of Dogri (Modern) Literature, An Introduction to Dogri Folk, Literature, Drama and Art, Chete Kish Khatte, Kish Mitthe, Rishtey and Kahani di Tapaash He has edited a number of books for Dogri Sanstha, Jammu and has translated Iyaruingam, an Assamese work by the novelist Birendera Kumar Bhattacharyya.

See also
 Jammu and Kashmir Academy of Art, Culture and Languages
 Dogri

References

Further reading

External links
 
 

1931 births
Writers from Jammu and Kashmir
2020 deaths
Recipients of the Padma Shri in literature & education
Indian Sanskrit scholars
Dogri language
Hindu College, Delhi alumni
Alumni of the University of Leeds
20th-century Indian translators
20th-century Indian linguists